RAAF Base Woomera (WMA), was proclaimed by Chief of Air Force Directive in January 2015. RAAF Base Woomera and the RAAF Woomera Test Range (WTR) are the two formations which make up the RAAF Woomera Range Complex (WRC). RAAF Base Woomera consists of two sectors, 'Base Sector North' which is a restricted access area and includes Camp Rapier. the entrance to the Woomera Test Range and the RAAF Woomera Airfield . 'Base Sector South' is accessible by the public and essentially encompasses that part of RAAF Base Woomera long referred to as the Woomera Village. Woomera Village is often quoted as a 'remote town'. It is not a 'town', but rather an 'open base' of the RAAF. The 'village' has previously always functioned as an Australian Government/Defence Force garrison facility until it was fully incorporated into RAAF Base Woomera in 2015.

Operations 
Officially established as an airbase with effect from January 2015, the RAAF Base Woomera comprises the Woomera airfield, hangars and technical areas as well as the Woomera Village.

Operations and capability management of the entire Woomera Range Complex, is vested to Commander, Air Warfare Centre (CDR AWC), located at RAAF Base Edinburgh (Edinburgh, South Australia). Operational management of the RAAF Base Woomera formation is the joint responsibility of No. 20 Squadron (20SQN) and the Defence Estate and Infracture Group (E&IG), supported by a Defence Contractor ( Broadspectrum).  The role of the base is to provide operational and garrison support to Defence activities within the WRC. The RAAF Woomera Test Range  formation of the Woomera Range Complex is managed by the AWC's Air Force Ranges Directorate (AFRD). The Air Force Test Ranges Squadron (AFTR SQN), is based out of RAAF Edinburgh, but they also maintain a permanent detachment based out of RAAF Base Woomera. The role of AFTR SQN is the day-to-day operation and management of the ranges within the WRC.

The Woomera Range Complex (WRC) is used as a specialised Defence systems test range supporting the defence of Australia. The Air Force, Department of Defence, and some State and Federal Government agencies (education, police etc.) maintain a number of full-time personnel at the base to support Defence activities at the WRC. The 2015 range proclamation states that the range may only be used for Defence related activities and that Defence access to, and use of the WRC will be managed through Headquarters, Air Warfare Centre at RAAF Base Edinburgh. Requests for Non-defence access to, and use  (e.g. mining) of, the Woomera Prohibited Area (WPA), which is essentially the ground area that delineates the Woomera Range Complex, is managed through the 'Woomera Prohibited Area Coordination Office' (WPACO) in Canberra. Note: Aeronautical access requirements for RAAF Woomera aerodrome can be found in the 'On-route supplement Australia' (ERSA). The entry for Woomera states that landing approval is coordinated through the 20SQN Air Base Command Post (20SQN ABCP), but that civilian aircraft are not normally given permission to use the airfield unless such use is related to Defence activities at Woomera.

RAAF Woomera is able to operate all current types of aircraft used by the Australian Defence Force (ADF), including C-17A Globemasters and all fast jet types. The airfield can be fitted with an arrestor cable system when required to bring it to normal RAAF operating standards for F/A-18 Hornet operations. The airfield is also well able to handle larger aircraft types such as the C-5 Galaxy and Boeing 747. Large aircraft movements occur often at Woomera in support of ADF test and evaluation activities on the complex.

Historical
The centre line of the airfield was surveyed by Len Beadell in early 1947. A RAF Dakota was the first aircraft to use the field, as it landed at Woomera on 19 June 1947. It brought General Evetts and a party of British scientists to inspect the airfield which was recently completed. During 2015, all of the Woomera aerodrome aircraft parking aprons (4), taxiways and the main runway, were all refurbished in $40M upgrade. In 2016, through public tender, a significant repair was made to Hangar 1, and in 2018 the airmovements terminal was refurbished and a new secure-storage facility built. A new connecting road between the magazine area (west of the airfield) and the northern end of the main runway was constructed. A new security control gate facility is under construction (2018) approximately 1 km north of Woomera Village, at the entrance to Base Sector North of RAAF Base Woomera.

The first control tower at the Woomera Test Range originally came from RAAF Base Uranquinty, New South Wales. The tower was disassembled by No. 2 Airfield Construction Squadron in the late 1940s and shipped to Woomera, where it was re-erected and reopened in the early 1950s at Evetts Field. The main control tower at Woomera aerodrome was constructed in 1953 and is still active. In 2016 the Department of Defence announced plans to replace the control cabin and an upgrade to all communications, electrical, mechanical and hydraulic services to the building in order to comply with building code requirements.

Evetts Field
On 15 May 1951 Koolymilka airfield was officially named Evetts Field in honour of Lieutenant General John Fullerton Evetts, who led the English party that selected the Woomera site for the Anglo-Australian Long Range Weapons Establishment, and handed over to the Department of Supply. Evetts Field is now only semi operational, mostly used as an emergency runway for the Flying Doctor and for RAAF operations. Evetts Field was used for launching the Jindivik target drone from 31 October 1950 to June 1975. The airfield was virtually abandoned in the 1970s, with its control tower and other buildings sold off and removed. The two runways are now in poor condition.

See also
 List of Royal Australian Air Force installations
 List of airports in South Australia

References

External links
 RAAF Base Woomera at www.airforce.gov.au
RAAF Base Woomera museum
 
 

Woomera
Woomera
1947 establishments in Australia
Airports established in 1947
Far North (South Australia)
Military installations established in 1947
Military installations in South Australia